Perk may refer to:

Places
Perk, Belgium, part of the municipality of Steenokkerzeel
Perk Castle, a castle near there
Perk Summit, Victoria Land, Antarctica

People
August Perk (1897–1945), anti-Nazi German resistance fighter
Brian Perk (born 1989), American soccer player
Ralph Perk (1914–1999), American politician
nickname of Percy Galbraith (1898–1961), Canadian National Hockey League forward
nickname of Kendrick Perkins (born 1984), American National Basketball Association player

Other uses
Employee benefit, also known as a perk, from perquisite: various non-wage compensations provided in addition to cash wages
Tetrachloroethylene, a chemical used for dry-cleaning, referred to in British English as Perk
Thermodynamic beta, a fundamental quantity in statistical mechanics
EIF2AK3, a human enzyme, often abbreviated as PERK
Perk, a bonus which gives a video game character a special ability

See also
 PERC (disambiguation)
Perks (disambiguation)
PERQ, a workstation computer